Francis Haywood Parker (June 23, 1920 - July 13, 2004) was an American philosopher and Charles A. Dana Professor of Philosophy at Colby College.

Life
He was born in Kuala Lumpur to Reverend Walter G. and Alma Shell Parker. He received his BA from the University of Evansville, his MA from Indiana University and his PhD from Harvard University. He was a president of the Metaphysical Society of America.

Works
 Logic as a human instrument, Harper 1959
 The story of western philosophy, Indiana University Press 1967
 Patterns of the Life-world: Essays in honor of John Wild, Northwestern University Press 1970
 Reason and faith revisited, Marquette University Press 1971

References

20th-century American philosophers
Philosophy academics
1920 births
2004 deaths
Presidents of the Metaphysical Society of America
Colby College faculty
Harvard University alumni
Indiana University alumni
University of Evansville alumni
American expatriates in Malaysia